Generally recognized as safe (GRAS) is a United States Food and Drug Administration (FDA) designation that a chemical or substance added to food is considered safe by experts under the conditions of its intended use. An ingredient with a GRAS designation is exempted from the usual Federal Food, Drug, and Cosmetic Act (FFDCA) food additive tolerance requirements. The concept of food additives being "generally recognized as safe" was first described in the Food Additives Amendment of 1958, and all additives introduced after this time had to be evaluated by new standards. The FDA list of GRAS notices is updated approximately each month, as of 2021.

History
On 6 September 1958, the Food Additives Amendment of 1958 was signed into law, with a list of 700 food substances that were exempt from the then-new requirement that manufacturers test food additives before putting them on the market. On August 31, 1960, William W. Goodrich, assistant general counsel of the FDA, addressed the annual meeting (16 Bus. Law. 107 1960–1961) of the FFDCA. The purpose of the meeting was the forthcoming March 6, 1961, effective date of the enforcement provisions of the "Food Additives Amendment of 1958", referred to as GRAS.

Designation and list
A GRAS determination can be self-affirmed or the FDA can be notified of a determination of GRAS by qualified non-governmental experts:
 Self-affirmed. The manufacturer of this chemical or substance had performed all necessary research, including the formation of an expert panel to review safety concerns, and is prepared to use these findings to defend its product's GRAS status.
 FDA Response to GRAS notification. The manufacturer has performed all the aforementioned due diligence, and submitted a GRAS notification to inform the FDA of a determination that the use of a substance is GRAS. Following evaluation, the FDA provides three possible responses: 1. FDA does not question the basis for the notifier's GRAS determination, 2. the notification does not provide a sufficient basis for GRAS determination, or 3. the FDA has, at the notifier's request, ceased to evaluate the GRAS notice.

 (beginning in 1998), 955 ingredient or food substances have been filed with the FDA. These petitions, submitted by sponsors or manufacturers, are reviewed for the safety evidence contained in the document. FDA posts status of the review as either without further questions (as a position of "no objection") or the petition is withdrawn by the applicant.

For substances used in food prior to January 1, 1958, a grandfather clause allows experience based on common use in food to be used in asserting an ingredient is safe under the conditions of their intended use.

The FDA can also explicitly withdraw the GRAS classification, as it did for trans fat in 2015.

List of GRAS notices
The list of GRAS notices is updated approximately each month by the FDA.

Code of Federal Regulations
The Code of Federal Regulations, revised , includes (CFR) title 21 170.30(b) that provides general recognition of safety through scientific procedures requires the same quantity and quality of scientific evidence needed to obtain approval of the substance as a food additive. and ordinarily is based upon published studies, which may be corroborated by unpublished studies and other data and information.

Intended use
The substance must be shown to be "generally recognized" as safe under the conditions of its intended use. For new proposals, the proponent of the exemption  usually a food manufacturer or ingredient supplier wishing to highlight a food ingredient in its manufactured product  has the burden of providing rigorous scientific evidence that use of the substance in an edible consumer product is safe. To establish GRAS, the proponent must show that there is a consensus of expert opinion that the substance is safe for its intended use. For existing GRAS items, new uses should not substantially exceed historical occurrence levels of the substance in the diet.

Enforcement
When use of a substance does not qualify for the GRAS exemption, it is subject to the premarket approval mandated by the Federal Food, Drug, and Cosmetic Act. In such circumstances, the FDA can take enforcement action to stop distribution of the food substance and foods containing it on the grounds that such foods are not deemed GRAS or contain an unlawfully added ingredient.

An example of a non-GRAS ingredient requiring enforcement actions in the form of FDA warning letters to 15 companies in 2019 was cannabidiol, which, as of 2021, had not been established with sufficient scientific evidence of safety as a GRAS ingredient.

See also 
 Generally recognized as safe and effective
 Novel food
 Substantial equivalence

References

External links 
 GRAS Notification Program, FDA, January 2020

Food additives
Food safety
Chemical safety
Food and Drug Administration
Food law